HP created a presence for its research division, HP Labs, in India in 2002. The mission for the new division was to create technology inspired by problems in countries such as India.

The first stated mission of the lab was
 "to generate innovations targeted at the world's emerging economies by understanding relevant social, cultural, economic and technological drivers." The mission morphed over time as follows. 
 In 2006, the mission statement read as: "HP Labs India is focused on  creating new technologies for addressing the IT needs of the next billion customers for HP."
 In 2013, the mission statement read as: "to create break-through innovations that enable HP to lead in the new wave of opportunities from rapidly growing economies."

Technology demonstrators 
The lab created concepts for simplifying computer and Internet interactions. Gesture KeyBoard (GKB)  was an early attempt by the lab to create a pen-based local-language-interaction-support for PCs.

Since low-cost mobile phones without data-plan were being used in higher volume in India, the lab developed a solution that can enable mobile users with only voice and SMS services to access websites. The technology was called SiteOnMobile.

Another hypothesis generated about technology in the Indian market was that many people in India own high-end Television and smart mobile phones, especially with the advent of Google Android phones. A new technology hypothesis was created so that Internet access to a large number of households and small-or-medium enterprises could be realized using a TV-connected broad-band device. The technology that demonstrated the efficacy of the hypothesis was called HP set-top box  and Vayu Internet Device (VIND).

The latest technology demonstrator was in the area of education called 
VideoBook, which aimed to reduce the cognitive load on text-book learning by automatically augmenting text-book content with videos from the Web.

Research Management 
In 2002, research was organized into research areas as follows: 
 Language technology such as speech communication interfaces for computers
 Low cost devices for Internet-access 
 Communication concepts for small towns and rural areas in developing countries
 Socio-economic research
 New models for human interactions

In 2013, research was organized into  research projects as follows: 
 Future school
 Crowd Cloud
 Smart Mobile Services 
 Interaction Technologies

Although the technique for research management changed, the focus of research remained creation of technologies for emerging markets.

References

Hewlett-Packard
Innovation in India
Indian subsidiaries of foreign companies